Cannabis and LGBT culture is the intersection of cannabis culture and LGBT culture. A common characteristic of advocacy for both LGBT rights and access to cannabis is that before about 2012 both were outside legal approval, social approval, and were on the fringe of society everywhere, and still are in much of the world. Advocacy for the two issues combined for various reasons, including claims that cannabis is an effective treatment for relieving symptoms of AIDS, the LGBT community having leadership in matters of social tolerance and diversity of lifestyles, and for both LGBT and cannabis issues experiencing social grouping together as counterculture.

By issue

Medical
In the timeline of HIV/AIDS at the start of the AIDS crisis in the 1980s there were not available pharmaceutical treatments to address the disease or provide relief of the symptoms. Many people could use medical cannabis to get relief that they could not get in any other way. However, at that time cannabis was illegal in many places. Because LGBT+ people were disproportionately affected by HIV/AIDS, the LGBT community had a new and urgent need for access to cannabis. activism for LGBT+ rights began to overlap with activism for access to cannabis. This LGBT activism for cannabis sometimes organized as clubs or social networks through which people with cannabis would distribute it to people with AIDS. In 1990 a news report claimed that many people with HIV use cannabis for palliative care.

LGBT and HIV activism greatly increased public support for access to cannabis.

Harvey Milk and Dennis Peron were San Francisco-based LGBT political figures who proposed legislation for legalizing cannabis to benefit the LGBT community and others.

Marketplace
There is evidence which suggests that the business sector which invests into cannabis production and sales has a lower percentage of LGBT representation than the consumer market for cannabis products.

There are also success stories of LGBT people in the cannabis industry and advocacy organizations like Proud Mary Network, and The Full Spectrum.

Analysis recommends marketing cannabis to LGBT communities.

In the United States

Political commentators in the United States have compared the rapid changing of public opinion in the 2000s-10s on the issues of LGBT rights and access to cannabis. Whereas before around 2010 both subjects were taboo in the mainstream, after that time there has been a growing trend to normalize social acceptance of both LGBT people and cannabis use. Many media outlets compared the similarities of LGBT and cannabis advocacy.

In the years leading to changes many reputed authorities incorrectly assessed public support for both LGBT and cannabis to be lower than it was. Federal laws in the United States were more misaligned than state laws on these subjects.

References

Cannabis culture
LGBT culture